38 athletes (28 men and 10 women) from Mexico competed at the 1996 Summer Paralympics in Atlanta, United States. Mexico won three gold medals, five silver and three bronze.

Medallists

See also
Mexico at the Paralympics
Mexico at the 1996 Summer Olympics

References 

Nations at the 1996 Summer Paralympics
1996
Summer Paralympics